Vaccinium consanguineum or Costa Rican blueberry  is a species of Vaccinium found in the montane forests of southern Mexico, Honduras, Costa Rica, and Panama at altitudes of 2100-3100 meters AMSL. In Costa Rica it is found in the Talamanca mountain range and the Central Volcanic mountain range.

Description 
Vaccinium consanguineum is an arborescent shrub 0.5-10m tall (on average 1-3m tall) whose very woody stems are first puberulent in appearance, and become glabrous with age.

Leaves narrow or broadly elliptic, occasionally oblong, 1-4.6cm long and 0.5-1.2cm wide, acute basally, gradually acute at apex, serrulate to crenate-serrate marginally, glabrous. Puberulent along midrib below, pinnately veined; the petiole is 1.5 to 3.0 mm.

Its inflorescence is a raceme, with several flowers; the rachis is 1 to 4 cm; the pedicel is 1 to 2 mm long, it is articulated with the calyx; the flowers have the hypanthium of 1.0 to 1.6 mm, glabrous, with lobes of 0.8 to 1.5 mm, apically ciliate or glabrous; the corolla is cylindrical and from 5.0 to 7.5 mm, glabrous on the outside and white with pink or reddish tints sometimes; thecae with two apical spurs; the tubules 1.2 to 1.8 mm. The fruit it produces is edible, and is characterized by being spherical in shame, 5 to 6 mm in diameter, glabrous, reddish to purple-black when ripe. It contains numerous small seeds and a small amount of pulp.

Cultivation 
The plant takes advantage of disturbed areas and edges of the oak forest or páramo for its development, where it is common to find it. Its flowering coincides with the wet season, and its fruiting with the beginning of the dry season, therefore it is common to find its fruits in December and February, even until April, when its flowering ends.

It reproduces easily from its rhizome, which is used as a dispersal method in nature, similarly to species of the Rubus genus.

Usage 
The fruit can be consumed directly, or used for the manufacture of juice and jelly, which acquires a consistency very similar to that produced with blackberry fruits, but which does not differ in flavor from the jelly produced with other more common species of the genus Vaccinium.

Risks 
The fruit of V. consanguineum can be confused with the fruit of a very similar looking species , which possesses a toxic compound tentatively named pernettine.

References

External links
 
 

consanguineum
Cloud forest flora of Mexico
Flora of Central America